The 1973 Louisiana Tech Bulldogs football team represented Louisiana Tech University during the 1973 NCAA Division II football season, and completed the 71st season of Bulldogs football and their first as members of the reorganized NCAA Division II. The Bulldogs played their home games in at Joe Aillet Stadium in Ruston, Louisiana. The 1973 team came off an undefeated 12–0 record, and a College Division National Championship from the prior season. The 1973 team was led by coach Maxie Lambright. The team finished the regular season with a 9–1 record and made the inaugural NCAA Division II playoffs. They made the first NCAA Division II Football Championship Game with a 38–34 win over Boise State in the Pioneer Bowl. The Bulldogs defeated the Western Kentucky Hilltoppers 34–0 in the Camellia Bowl National Championship Game.

Schedule

References

Louisiana Tech
Louisiana Tech Bulldogs football seasons
NCAA Division II Football Champions
Southland Conference football champion seasons
Camellia Bowl champion seasons
Pioneer Bowl champion seasons
Louisiana Tech Bulldogs football